Martin "Mark" Lagdameo Lopez is the chairman of ABS-CBN Corporation, the largest entertainment and media conglomerate in the Philippines, with investments primarily in television, radio, cable telecommunications, and film production.

Education 
Lopez completed INSEAD’s general management program in 2017, received his Executive Masters in Business Administration degree from the Asian Institute of Management in 2003, and earned his bachelor’s degree in Business Administration from Menlo College, California in 1994.

Career 
Before joining ABS-CBN, Lopez was the vice president and chief information officer of Manila Electric Company (Meralco). He also served as president of e-Meralco Ventures Inc until 2010. He joined  ABS-CBN as its chief technology officer. As chief technology officer, he set the company’s strategic directions and ensured operational excellence in information and communications, and technology broadcast engineering.

Lopez was elected chairman on April 18, 2018, succeeding his cousin Eugenio "Gabby" Lopez III, who served as chairman since 1997. On October 2, 2020, Lopez was elected vice-chairman of Lopez Holdings Corporation.

References

Chairmen of ABS-CBN
Filipino chairpersons of corporations
ABS-CBN executives
Mark
Menlo College alumni
Asian Institute of Management alumni
Living people
Year of birth missing (living people)